"Noël, que du bonheur" (English: "Christmas, Only Happiness") is a 2005 song recorded by the French singer Ilona. It was the fourth single from her first album Un Monde parfait and was released in the first days of December 2005. As the title suggests it, it is a Christmas song and it hit the top ten in France and Belgium (Wallonia).

Lyrics and music
"Noël, que du bonheur" was composed by Laurent Jeanne, Philippe Pelet, Olivier Perrot and Dan Mitrecey. Unlike the three previous singles, it was not released as a CD maxi.

An acoustic version is available on the second album of Ilona, Laissez-nous respirer.

Chart performances
In France, the single debuted at a peak of number five on 10 December 2005, seeling about 21,500 units that week. The next two weeks, the single ranked number six with respectively 21,472 and 37,680 sales. Then it did not stop to drop very quickly and fell off the chart after twelve weeks. On 31 December, the Syndicat National de l'Édition Phonographique certified the single Silver disc.

The song was number 84 on the 2005 French singles year end chart. In April 2006, the SNEP revealed that "Noël, que du bohneur" was the 87th best-selling singles during the first quarter of 2006.

In Belgium (Wallonia), the single entered the Ultratop 40 at number 26 on 24 December 2005, then jumped to number ten the following week, then dropped. It totalled five weeks on the chart.

Track listings
 CD single - France

 Digital download

Credits and personnel

 Produced by Ivan Russo, Laurent Jeanne, Philippe Pelet, Dan Mitrecey and Olivier Perrot
 Lead vocal : Ilona
 Choirs by The Ilonettes : Lena Nester, Rokhya-Lucie Dieng, Sophie Lemoine
 Additional choirs : Noémie Brosset, Maïlis Mitrecey
 Synth : Philippe Pelet, Ivan Russo, Laurent Jeanne, Damydee
 Accordion : Ivan Russo

 Additional production : Ivan Russo and Domydee at Atollorecording Studio (Naples)
 Executive production assistance : Gilles Caballero, Roxanne Perrot
 All vocals recorded by Philippe Vandenhende
 At Moneypenny Studio (Paris) with Franck Benhamou and Benoît Cinquin
 At Ty-Houam Studio (Préfailles) with Gilles Caballero
 Mixed and mastered by Ivan Russo at Atollorecording Studio (Naples)

Charts

Weekly charts

Year-end charts

Certifications and sales

References

2005 singles
Christmas songs
Ilona Mitrecey songs
2005 songs